Josh is a masculine given name. 

Josh may also refer to:

Film and television
 Josh (2000 film), a Bollywood action film directed by Mansoor Khan
 Josh (2009 Kannada film), a film directed by Shivamani
 Josh (2009 Telugu film), a film directed by Vasu Varma
 Josh (2010 film), a Bengali film directed by Rabi Kinagi
 Josh: Independence Through Unity, a 2013 Pakistani film by Iram Parveen
 Josh (TV series), a British sitcom starring Josh Widdicombe
 "Josh" (The Outer Limits), a television episode

Music
 Josh (band), a Canadian Indian/Pakistani fusion band
 "Josh", a 2021 song by Peach PRC

Other uses
 "Josh", an early pen name of Samuel Clemens (1835–1910), better known as Mark Twain, American writer and lecturer
 Josh (novel), a 1971 young adult novel by Ivan Southall
 City of Josh, a location in the Book of Mormon

See also
 Josh fight, a 2021 meme event
 Joshua (disambiguation)